Rochelle Squires is a Canadian provincial politician who has served as the Member of the Legislative Assembly of Manitoba for the riding of Riel since 2016. A member of the Progressive Conservative party, she was first elected in the 2016 Manitoba election, defeating NDP incumbent Christine Melnick.

On May 3, 2016, Squires was appointed to the Executive Council of Manitoba as Minister of Sport, Culture and Heritage, Minister responsible for Francophone Affairs and Minister responsible for Status of Women.

On August 17, 2017, Squires was shuffled out of the Ministry of Sport, Culture and Heritage but retained her other titles.

She was re-elected in the 2019 provincial election.

In the wake of the resignation of premier Brian Pallister on September 1, 2021, Squires was selected by Premier Kelvin Goertzen to serve as deputy premier of Manitoba, the position Goertzen himself held before Pallister's resignation.

Personal life
Squires and her husband Daniel have a combined family of five children and two grandsons.

References

Living people
Politicians from Winnipeg
Deputy premiers of Manitoba
Progressive Conservative Party of Manitoba MLAs
Women MLAs in Manitoba
Members of the Executive Council of Manitoba
Women government ministers of Canada
21st-century Canadian women politicians
Year of birth missing (living people)